FNaF World is an indie role-playing video game created by Scott Cawthon. It is the first official spin-off to the Five Nights at Freddy's series and the fifth game overall. The game was released for Microsoft Windows on January 21, 2016, and Android on January 12, 2017, but came with unfinished gameplay and a large amount of bugs, leading to bad reception and ultimately the decision for the game's removal from digital storefronts. On February 8, 2016, the game was updated, and re-released on Game Jolt free of charge.

Gameplay
The player has two modes to play in: Adventure and Fixed Party. The game also has two difficulty levels to choose from, Normal and Hard. The player starts by choosing two parties consisting of four characters each. The starter characters, the original and toy versions of the first main games characters, can all be swapped in and out of the party. As the player continues, they collect more characters to place in their party, with there being 40 characters available in total from across the first four games. Along the way, a character known as Fredbear will give the player tips on what to do next. These tips frequently break the fourth wall due to Fredbear's seeming awareness of the situation he is placed in.

The gameplay consists of exploring through the game world and accessing new areas. Once new areas are revealed and a special button is pressed in them, the player can use "jumping" to teleport between each area through an overworld map. Initially, the world was depicted in a 2D Atari-like style, but as of Version 1.2 released in May 2016, the world has been redesigned into that of a pre-rendered 3D style. Many enemy characters can be found throughout the game, each exclusive to their own area, which can be battled with. Upon defeating an enemy, the player will gain experience points and "Faz Tokens", which are used to buy upgrades such as "chips" and "bytes" to aid the player during the game.

The battles consist of turn-based random encounters, with several boss battles. For each turn, the player is given choices for each character and must choose one of their three commands, which differ depending on the characters. The commands have different color tags and have different impacts, including healing the team (pink), providing status buffs (white), single-target attacks (orange), area attacks (red), poisonous attacks (green), and possible instant-kill attacks (black), among others. Once a turn is used, the player has to wait for some time until the next turn begins. The player can also swap the current party with the reserve at any time. After each battle, all characters, including those who may have been knocked out, are restored to full health.

The Game Jolt version upgraded the overworld's graphics to pre-rendered 3D. Version 1.2 added a new area where the player completes minigames such as "Foxy Fighters", "Chica's Magic Rainbow", "Foxy.EXE" and "FNAF 57: Freddy in Space" to unlock new characters.

Setting
FNaF World takes place in a world inhabited by enemies and various characters from the Five Nights at Freddy's series, who live in different biomes, including a snowy plain, a forest, a graveyard, a lake, a carnival, and a cave system. There also exists an inner dimension known as the "Flipside", in which there are several glitches that enable travel to otherwise unreachable places. The Flipside has four layers in total, although going beyond the third level is a point of no return, leading to an alternate ending. Update 2 added the Halloween Update area, from which various minigames can be accessed, along with the final area: a toxic maze where the final boss of Update 2 is located.

Development 
FNaF World was first announced on September 15, 2015, in a Steam post by Cawthon. Later, a trailer was uploaded to YouTube, depicting the characters of the four previous games as cute. The announcement was considered to be a hoax due to similar PR actions taken by Cawthon, however, it was not disproven until its release. Cawthon noted that the game is a spin-off, considering the main arc of Five Nights at Freddy's completed with the fourth game. Though originally planned for release on February 2, 2016, Cawthon rescheduled the release to January 22, 2016, but eventually launched yet another day earlier, on January 21, 2016, respectively, releasing it digitally through Steam.

On February 8, 2016, an updated version was released to Game Jolt as freeware, featuring a new overworld, as well as other new features.
Upon release, community and critics criticized the game for missing key features, being unstable and generally unfinished, which Cawthon later apologized for, stating that "[he] got too eager to show the things that were finished, that [he] neglected to pay attention to the things that weren't." He agreed with the community that he had rushed the release, and that the game's rough state was unacceptable. Cawthon stated that he would be working hard to get the game in order, but this eventually led to Cawthon temporarily taking the game off Steam, offering refunds to everyone who bought it. It was later announced that, once the game would be patched further, it would be released for free, first to Game Jolt, and stay free from that point on.

On May 13, 2016, a second update to FNaF World was released, featuring new characters and a new map, as well as voice acting.

On January 12, 2017, FNaF World was released on Android, but was removed the next day. On January 31, 2017, Cawthon dispelled any rumors of the highly speculated "Update 3", saying that no further updates will be made to the game. He expressed his dissatisfaction of the game, stating that most mistakes in development were made "very early", and that attempting to better the game would "be remaking the game from scratch". He later removed the game from Steam.

In 2018, Cawthon revealed that after making the first Five Nights at Freddy's games that were horrific in nature, he wanted to do something lighthearted with FNaF World. It was originally designed to be a mobile game but halfway into development, it became a PC game, which was something he regretted. In hindsight, he felt the game should have been developed in later years as he felt it disrupted the series' canon and fans' expectations at the time. He described FNaF World as the least valuable game he has ever made (profit-wise) and as such, it served as the "gemstone" of quality control to the franchise. Despite the major setback, Cawthon was grateful for the fanbase it had created.

Reception 
FNaF World received generally mixed reception among critics and the community, with many YouTube gamers responsible for launching the franchise to its high popularity. However, popular content creator Markiplier, who is often credited with bringing the original game out of obscurity, opted not to play it, most likely influencing how critics responded to the spin-off. However, Angelo M. D'Argenio from The Escapist gave the game a decent review, stating that "Five Nights at Freddy's World is a retro parody JRPG that feels incomplete now, but is steadily getting better as patches come out", giving FNaF World 3 out of 5 stars. However, the game never reached the success that other Five Nights at Freddy's games did.

Notes

References

External links

 

2016 video games
Android (operating system) games
Cancelled iOS games
World
Indie video games
Role-playing video games
Video games developed in the United States
Windows games
Single-player video games
Clickteam Fusion games
Video games about robots